The Old Dominion–VCU men's basketball rivalry is a men's college basketball rivalry between the VCU Rams of Virginia Commonwealth University and the Old Dominion Monarchs of Old Dominion University. This rivalry is said to be one of the most competitive amongst middle level Division-I basketball programs.

Background

The rivalry between Virginia Commonwealth University and Old Dominion University exists primarily because of the similar histories of the two Virginia public universities. Both schools have historic affiliations with The College of William & Mary (W&M). One of VCU's predecessor institutions, the Richmond Professional Institute (RPI), became part of W&M in 1925. ODU was founded in 1930 as the Norfolk Division of W&M. In addition, from 1960 to 1962, both RPI and the Norfolk Division were part of The Colleges of William & Mary, a short-lived university system consisting of W&M and its affiliated institutions.

VCU, located in the state capital of Richmond, is just 90 miles down Interstate 64 from ODU, located in Norfolk. Both schools are major research universities located in an urban environment. They are also both very large universities consisting of a diverse student body; with students primarily coming from middle-class backgrounds.

Throughout much of the history of the rivalry, ODU and VCU had been in the same conference, most recently the Colonial Athletic Association. This ended after the 2011–12 season when VCU joined the Atlantic 10 Conference. ODU left the CAA for Conference USA a year later.

Rick Kiefner, a 1969 graduate of ODU who worked on Saturday's radio broadcast of the game, tells a story that he thinks best reflects the beginnings of the intensity - and animosity - between the programs. During the 1970 season, Kiefner was part of a group of about 50 ODU fans who chartered a bus to Richmond for a game at VCU's old Franklin Street gym. After mailing a check for the tickets, the ODU group received a package in return from VCU. But no tickets were inside. Instead, somebody had sent a box of screws.

Game results

Notes

References

College basketball rivalries in the United States
College sports in Virginia
Old Dominion Monarchs men's basketball
VCU Rams men's basketball
Sports rivalries in Virginia